Lycée Georges Brassens is a senior high school/sixth-form college in Courcouronnes, Essonne, France, in the Paris metropolitan area. Serving the Évry area, it first opened in 1983.

References

External links
 Lycée Georges Brassens 

Lycées in Essonne
1983 establishments in France
Educational institutions established in 1983